Tobias Grahn (born 5 March 1980) is a Swedish former professional footballer who played as an attacking midfielder. He won the 2002 Norwegian Football Cup with Vålerenga and the 2004 Allsvenskan with Malmö FF. A full international between 2001 and 2003, he won four caps for the Sweden national team, scoring one goal.

Club career
In August 2003, he left Norwegian club Vålerenga and returned to Sweden, signing with Malmö FF. While with Malmö, Grahn made 21 appearances and scored three goals but soon fell out of favor with coach Tom Prahl. As a result, he left the club and returned to Denmark, signing with AGF Aarhus. In his first season with Aarhus, Grahn enjoyed great success appearing in 22 league matches and scoring 8 goals and providing 13 assists as the clubs playmaker. After appearing in 47 league matches and scoring 10 goals in his two seasons at the club, Grahn was sent on loan to Odense BK for the 2006–07 season. Grahn got off to a great start with Odense scoring six goals in 15 league matches and helped the Danish club to an impressive run in the 2006–07 UEFA Cup. As a result, he began to draw interest from clubs in the top leagues in Europe. During the winter transfer period he was sold to Spain's Gimnàstic. On 18 February 2007, Grahn played his first La Liga match for Gimnàstic against Racing de Santander. While with Gimnàstic, he appeared in nine league matches and scored two goals but injuries limited his chances with the club. At the end of the season, Gimnàstic was relegated to the Spanish Second Division, and Grahn was sent on loan to Hertha BSC in Germany.

In the January transfer window of 2009, Grahn was rumored to return to Danish football, with Brøndby IF being the most likely destination. On 28 January 2009, he was transferred to Danish super league club Randers on a three-year contract. Grahn was so disappointed about his own performances and lack of success at Randers FC that he offered to leave the club in November 2009. So on 12 November 2009, he was granted a free transfer by the club and returned on 14 November 2009 to Berlin for a trial with 1. FC Union Berlin. He signed for Swedish top-tier club Mjällby AIF before the start of the 2010 season. During his two years at the club he was a success on the pitch and a big profile at the club but also the cause of conflicts and controversial statements.

During January 2012, it was reported that Grahn was close to agreeing to terms with New York Red Bulls in Major League Soccer. He was also spotted near his old training grounds at Malmö, training by his own and wearing his old Malmö FF clothes. However, in early February 2012, Grahn announced that he would be joining Örebro SK. After a disappointing first season where the club was relegated Grahn announced that he had come to an agreement with Örebro to end his contract. He told the media that playing in the second tier did not "harmonize with his ambitions".

In March 2013 he signed a contract with Brønshøj Boldklub in the Danish 1st Division. In August 2014 he was persuaded to play for Gentofte-Vangede IF in the Danish 2nd Division East by head coach Søren Fjorting whom Grahn knew from their past at Lyngby Boldklub.

International career
Grahn made his debut for the Sweden U21 national team in 2001. He made his first appearance for the full national side during January 2001 in a 0–0 draw with the Faroe Islands.

Career statistics

International 

Scores and results list Sweden's goal tally first, score column indicates score after each Grahn goal.

Honours 
Vålerenga

 Norwegian Football Cup: 2002

Malmö FF

 Allsvenskan: 2004

References

External links
 Official Danish Superliga stats 
 Tobias Grahn at fotbolltransfers.com 
 
 
 

Living people
Swedish footballers
Sweden international footballers
Sweden under-21 international footballers
Swedish expatriate footballers
Allsvenskan players
Eliteserien players
Östers IF players
Lyngby Boldklub players
Odense Boldklub players
Aarhus Gymnastikforening players
La Liga players
Gimnàstic de Tarragona footballers
Hertha BSC players
Primeira Liga players
S.C. Beira-Mar players
Randers FC players
Danish Superliga players
Bundesliga players
Expatriate footballers in Portugal
Swedish expatriate sportspeople in Portugal
Expatriate men's footballers in Denmark
Expatriate footballers in Norway
Swedish expatriate sportspeople in Norway
Expatriate footballers in Spain
Swedish expatriate sportspeople in Spain
Expatriate footballers in Germany
Swedish expatriate sportspeople in Germany
Malmö FF players
Mjällby AIF players
Vålerenga Fotball players
Brønshøj Boldklub players
1980 births
Association football midfielders
People from Karlskrona
Sportspeople from Blekinge County